Spassky District is an administrative and municipal district (raion), one of the twenty-seven in Penza Oblast, Russia. It is located in the northwest of the oblast. Its administrative center is the town of Spassk. Population: 13,008 (2010 Census);  The population of Spassk accounts for 57.2% of the district's total population.

History
Until March 14, 2006, the district was called Bednodemyanovsky.

Notable residents 

Viktor Rodin (1928–2011), Soviet Strategic Missile Forces colonel general, born in the village of Dubrovka

References

Notes

Sources

Districts of Penza Oblast
